Nahkampfkanone 2 is a prototype tank destroyer of Swiss design.

History and development 

The hull and the superstructure were made of cast steel by the Georg Fischer AG. The construction of the chassis was by Saurer in Arbon, the assembly of the chassis at Berna in Olten and the design and installation of the gun of the K + W in Thun. Driver, commander and the horizontal gunner sat side left, right vertical gunner and loader. The gun was mounted in a hull based superstructure and had only a limited traverse arc, so the entire vehicle had to be turned onto the target before the gun itself could be aimed. The gun barrel could be retracted for travel.

Four different types (A1, A2, B1, B2) were planned, but one prototype was made and that did not see service; only driving tests were made in Thun from 1946 to 1947 for testing in troop deployment. Development was stopped in 1947.

The prototype is on display at the tank museum in Thun.

See also 
 Nahkampfkanone 1

References 

 Book Urs Heller: Die Panzer der schweizer Armee von 1920 bis 2008 
 Military Museum Thun Switzerland
  NZZ newspaper, video clip (German) about Swiss tanks, Nahkampfkanone 1, Nahkampfkanone 2

Armoured fighting vehicles of Switzerland
Abandoned military projects of Switzerland
Tank destroyers